Gabriel Nava (born 22 March 1952) is a Mexican basketball player. He competed in the men's tournament at the 1976 Summer Olympics.

References

1952 births
Living people
Mexican men's basketball players
Olympic basketball players of Mexico
Basketball players at the 1976 Summer Olympics
Place of birth missing (living people)